FRE or Fre may refer to:

 Pedro Fré (1924–2014), Brazilian Roman Catholic bishop
 Fré Cohen (1903–1943), Dutch artist
 Federal Rules of Evidence in the United States
 Fleet Ready Escort, a Royal Navy deployment
 Formula Regional European Championship (FRE championship), a Formula 3 regional racing league
 FRE Records, a Canadian record label
 Freeplay Energy, a British electronic manufacturer
 Freedom Air (Guam), a defunct airline of Guam, ICAO code FRE
 Freeport station (Maine), Amtrak code FRE
 The ISO 639-2 code for the French language
 Freshfield railway station, in England
 Riboflavin reductase (NAD(P)H), an enzyme

See also